Thomas Aquinas Higgins (August 15, 1932 – September 11, 2018) was an American jurist who was United States district judge of the United States District Court for the Middle District of Tennessee.

Education and career
He was born in Nashville, Tennessee and attended Father Ryan High School. He received an Associate of Arts degree from Christian Brothers College in 1952 and a Bachelor of Arts degree from the University of Tennessee in 1954. He received a Bachelor of Laws from Vanderbilt University Law School in 1957. He was in the United States Army Judge Advocate General's Corps from 1957 to 1960, where he attained the rank of first lieutenant. He was in private practice in Nashville from 1961 to 1984.

Federal judicial service
Higgins was nominated by President Ronald Reagan on September 6, 1984, to a seat on the United States District Court for the Middle District of Tennessee vacated by Judge Leland Clure Morton. He was confirmed by the United States Senate on October 3, 1984, and received his commission on October 4, 1984. He assumed senior status on February 28, 1999 and retired into inactive senior status in 2006, meaning that while he remained a federal judge, he no longer heard cases or participated in the business of the court. He died on September 11, 2018, in Nashville.

References

Sources
 

1932 births
2018 deaths
Christian Brothers University alumni
Judges of the United States District Court for the Middle District of Tennessee
United States district court judges appointed by Ronald Reagan
20th-century American judges
United States Army officers
People from Nashville, Tennessee
Military personnel from Tennessee
Tennessee lawyers
University of Tennessee alumni
Vanderbilt University Law School alumni
United States Army Judge Advocate General's Corps